The Moor may refer to:
 Personification of the Moors, in their collective role as a medieval political force

Geography
 The Moor, the core street of The Moor Quarter of Sheffield, England
 The Moor, Hawkhurst, the green within The Moor Quarter's village and civil parish, England

Arts, entertainment, and media
 Othello (character), often referred to as "The Moor", e.g., by Shakespeare
 The Moor (novel) (1998) by L.R. King
 "The Moor" (The Borgias) (2011), episode of the television series

See also
Moor (disambiguation)